Robert Hall may refer to:

Business and economics
 Robert Taggart Hall (1877–1920), American owner of ceramics business
 Robert M. Hall (1909–1998), American media executive and publisher
 Robert Hall, Baron Roberthall (1901–1988), Australian economist and adviser
 Robert Hall (Canadian) (1949–2016), Canadian businessman
 Robert Hall (economist) (born 1943), American economist

Entertainment
 Robert Browne Hall (1858–1907), American musician
 Robert David Hall (born 1947), American actor
 Robert Green Hall (1973–2021), American director and special effects artist
 Robert Hall, birth name of Lord Finesse (born 1970), American hip hop producer
 Robert Hall, alternative name of Jefferson Hall (actor) (born 1977), English actor
 Logic (rapper) (Sir Robert Bryson Hall II, born 1990), American rapper, singer and songwriter

Military
 Robert Hall (Texas Ranger) (1814–1899), Texas settler, soldier, and Texas Ranger
 Robert Hall (Royal Navy officer) (1817–1882), Royal Navy officer
 Robert Hall (RAF officer) (1888–?), World War I flying ace
 Robert Hall (National Guard officer) (born 1895), officer in the North Dakota Army National Guard in WWII
 Robert Hall (aircraft designer) (1905–1991), American aircraft designer and test pilot
 Robert E. Hall (soldier) (born 1947), U.S. Army Senior NCO and eleventh Sergeant Major of the Army

Politics
 Robert Hall (MP for York) (died 1565), MP for City of York
 Robert Hall (MP for Beverley) (fl. 1563), MP for Beverley
 Robert Hall (MP for Hastings) (died 1536), MP for Hastings
 Robert Hall (MP for Leeds) (1801–1857), English politician, Member of Parliament for Leeds
 Robert Newton Hall (1836–1907), lawyer, educator, judge and political figure in Quebec
 Robert Hanley Hall (1850–1924), Irish-born fur trader and political figure in British Columbia
 Robert Richard Hall (1865–1938), Canadian politician
 Robert Bernard Hall (1812–1868), member of the U.S. House of Representatives from Massachusetts
 Robert S. Hall (1879–1941), U.S. Representative from Mississippi
 Bob Hall (politician) (Robert Lee Hall, born 1942), member of the Texas State Senate
 Robert A. Hall (born 1946), Massachusetts State Senator
 Robert Hall (Antiguan politician) (1909–1994), Deputy Premier of Antigua and Barbuda
 Robert Hall (New Brunswick politician) (1930–2016), NDP member for Tantamar
 Robert Hall (British Army officer) (1939–2016), British Army officer and politician

Religion
 Robert Hall, the elder (1728–1791), English Particular Baptist minister in Leicestershire
 Robert Hall (minister) (1764–1831), English Baptist minister
 Robert Bruce Hall (1921–1985), bishop of the Episcopal Diocese of Virginia

Science
 Robert Hall (ornithologist) (1867–1949), Australian ornithologist
 Robert E. Hall (physician) (died 1995), American physician and abortion rights advocate
 Robert L. Hall (1927–2012), American anthropologist
 Robert N. Hall (1919–2016), American engineer, responsible for work on semiconductor optics

Sports
 Robert Hall (basketball) (1927–2014), American basketball player for Harlem Globetrotters
 Robert Hall (cricketer) (born 1963), English cricketer for Herefordshire
 Robert Hall (footballer) (born 1993), Oxford United footballer
 Robert Hall (gridiron football) (born 1970), American football and Canadian football quarterback and wide receiver

Other
 Robert B. Hall (Japanologist) (1896–1975), American geographer
 Robert A. Hall Jr. (1911–1997), American linguist
 Robert Howell Hall (1921–1995), U.S. federal judge
 Rob Hall (1961–1996), New Zealand mountain guide
 Robert Hall (journalist) (active since 1977), British journalist
 Robert Hall Clothes (1937–1977), American retail company
 Robert Lee Hall (1922–1990), architect based in Memphis, Tennessee

See also
Bob Hall (disambiguation)
Bert Hall (disambiguation)